The 2014 World RX of Argentina was the 12th and final round of the inaugural season of the FIA World Rallycross Championship. The event was held at the Autodromo Rosendo Hernandez in San Luis, Cuyo.

Heats

Semi-finals

Semi-final 1

Semi-final 2

Final

Championship standings after the event

References

External links

|- style="text-align:center"
|width="35%"|Previous race:2014 World RX of Turkey
|width="30%"|FIA World Rallycross Championship2014 season
|width="35%"|Next race:2015 World RX of Portugal
|- style="text-align:center"
|width="35%"|Previous race:None
|width="30%"|World RX of Argentina
|width="35%"|Next race:2015 World RX of Argentina
|- style="text-align:center"

Argentina
World RX